Michigan Township is one of twenty-one townships in LaPorte County, Indiana. As of the 2010 census, its population was 27,522 and it contained 13,216 housing units.

History
Michigan Township was organized in 1833, and named from Lake Michigan, which forms its northwestern border.

The George and Adele Jaworowski House (1945-1946) was listed on the National Register of Historic Places in 2013.

Geography

References

External links
 Indiana Township Association
 United Township Association of Indiana

Townships in LaPorte County, Indiana
Townships in Indiana